The Mirage 24 is a Canadian trailerable sailboat designed by Cuthbertson & Cassian, the naval architecture design division at C&C Yachts, as a Midget Ocean Racing Club (MORC) racer and first built in 1972.

Production
The boat was built by Mirage Yachts in Canada, starting in 1972. It was their first production design and is a development of the Cuthbertson & Cassian designed Northern 1/4 Ton. The design is now out of production.

Design

Dick and Irene Steffen owned a yacht dealership for C&C Yachts, in Pointe Claire, Quebec. The company had been very successful selling C&C boats, but the C&C line did not offer a boat smaller than the C&C 27 at that time. Dick Steffen was a competitive sailing racer and thought that there would be a good market for a C&C-built 24 foot keelboat for MORC racing. At his request  Cuthbertson & Cassian designed the boat, but decided not to proceed with production at C&C. Steffen bought the design from them and founded Mirage Yachts in February 1972 to build the boat.

The Mirage 24 sold well and the company soon had 15 employees building the boat model in their rented second floor facility in Pointe Claire. One factor driving the Mirage 24's strong sales was its racing record in MORC class events. Even 15 years after its introduction a Mirage 24 won the production boat division in the MORC national championships.

Caught off guard by the success of the design, C&C decided to produce a competitor, the C&C 25, which was very similar to the Mirage 24's design. The Mirage 24 continued to sell well and usually beat the C&C 25 in competition.

The Mirage 24 is a small recreational keelboat, built predominantly of fibreglass. It has a masthead sloop rig, a transom-hung rudder and a fixed fin keel. It displaces  and carries  of ballast.

The boat is normally fitted with a small  outboard motor for docking and maneuvering.

The design has sleeping accommodation for four people, with a double "V"-berth in the bow cabin and two straight settee berths in the main cabin. The galley is located on the starboard side at the companionway ladder. The galley is equipped with a two-burner stove, icebox and a double sink. The head is located just aft of the bow cabin on the port side.

Variants

Mirage 24
This model was introduced in 1972 and fits the standard height mast. The design has a PHRF racing average handicap of 225.
Mirage 24 SM
The boat has a PHRF racing average handicap of 228 with a high of 224 and low of 234.
Mirage 24 TM
The boat has a PHRF racing average handicap of 228 with a high of 231 and low of 222.

Operational history

In a review Michael McGoldrick wrote, "the Mirage 24 belongs in that Canadian Sailboat Hall of Fame if only because it is the boat which launched Mirage Yachts...The Mirage 24 is pretty boat with a fair amount of interior space. This boat did very well in the MORC fleet, and its owners report that its performance really starts to shine in medium winds."

In a 2010 review Steve Henkel wrote, "best features: This is a boat designed to go fast in Quarter Ton racing, and she does. Worst features: Her ballast is higher than her comps, which leads us to assume that she could be faster in heavy air but slower in light air compared to her comp[etitor]s."

See also
List of sailing boat types

Related development
Northern 1/4 Ton

Similar sailboats
Achilles 24
Atlantic City catboat
Balboa 24
C&C 24
C&C SR 25
Challenger 24
Columbia 24
Islander 24
Islander 24 Bahama
J/24
MacGregor 24
Nutmeg 24
San Juan 24
Seidelmann 245
Shark 24
Tonic 23

References

External links

Keelboats
1970s sailboat type designs
Sailing yachts
Trailer sailers
Sailboat type designs by C&C Design
Sailboat types built by Mirage Yachts